The Adelbert von Chamisso Prize was a German literary award established in 1985, given to a work whose author's mother tongue is not German, as was the case for Adelbert von Chamisso. It was offered by the Robert Bosch Stiftung.

In addition to the main prize with a prize money of €15,000, one or more promotional prizes ("Förderpreise") with a prize money of €7,000 and sometimes an honorary award ("Ehrengabe") were given.

The prize was created by Harald Weinrich.

In 2016, the Robert Bosch Stiftung announced that the prize would be discontinued after the final 2017 award, saying that it had now fulfilled its original objective.

Winners 
The list shows the main prize, the promotional prizes ("PP"), and the honorary awards.

 1985 – Aras Ören; PP: Rafik Schami
 1986 – Ota Filip
 1987 – Franco Biondi and Gino Chiellino
 1988 – Elazar Benyoëtz; PP: Zafer Şenocak
 1989 – Yüksel Pazarkaya; PP: Zehra Çırak
 1990 – Cyrus Atabay; PP: Alev Tekinay
 1991 – Libuše Moníková; PP: SAID
 1992 – Adel Karasholi and Galsan Tschinag
 1993 – Rafik Schami; PP: Ismet Elci
 1994 – Dante Andrea Franzetti; PP: Dragica Rajcić
 1995 – György Dalos; PP: László Csiba
 1996 – Yoko Tawada; PP: Marijan Nakić
 1997 – Güney Dal and José F. A. Oliver; honorary award: Jiří Gruša
 1998 – Natascha Wodin; PP: Abdellatif Belfellah
 1999 – Emine Sevgi Özdamar; PP: Selim Özdogan
 2000 – Ilija Marinow Trojanow; PP: Terézia Mora and Aglaja Veteranyi
 2001 – Zehra Çırak; PP: Radek Knapp and Vladimir Vertlib; honorary award: Imre Kertész
 2002 – SAID; PP: Francesco Micieli and Catalin Dorian Florescu; honorary award: Harald Weinrich
 2003 – Ilma Rakusa; PP: Hussain al-Mozany and Marica Bodrozic
 2004 – Asfa-Wossen Asserate and Zsuzsa Bánk; PP: Yadé Kara
 2005 – Feridun Zaimoğlu; PP: Dimitré Dinev
 2006 – Zsuzsanna Gahse; PP: Sudabeh Mohafez and Eleonora Hummel
 2007 – Magdalena Sadlon; PP: Que Du Luu and Luo Lingyuan
 2008 – Saša Stanišić; PP: Michael Stavarič and Léda Forgó
 2009 – Artur Becker; PP: María Cecilia Barbetta and Tzveta Sofronieva
 2010 – Terézia Mora; PP: Abbas Khider and Nino Haratischwili
 2011 – Jean Krier; PP: Olga Martynova and Nicol Ljubić
 2012 – Michael Stavarič; PP: Akos Doma and Ilir Ferra
 2013 – Marjana Gaponenko; PP: Matthias Nawrat and Anila Wilms
 2014 – Ann Cotten; PP: Dana Ranga and Nellja Veramoj
 2015 – Sherko Fatah, PP: Olga Grjasnowa and Martin Kordic
 2016 – Esther Kinsky and Uljana Wolf
 2017 – Abbas Khider; Barbi Marković and Senthuran Varatharajah (FP)

References

External links 
  

German literary awards
Adelbert von Chamisso
Awards established in 1985
1985 establishments in Germany